3p deletion syndrome is a rare genetic disorder caused by the deletion of small fragments of chromosome 3.

Presentation 
Reports symptoms in patients with 3p deletion syndrome are intellectual disability, delayed psychomotor development, abnormal facial features, muscular hypotonia, epilepsy, and deformation of the gastrointestinal and urinary tracts.

Clinical phenotypes are often considerably mild, and genetic testing is required for diagnosis.

References 

Syndromes affecting the gastrointestinal tract
Autosomal monosomies and deletions
Genetic diseases and disorders
Syndromes affecting head size
Syndromes with intellectual disability
Syndromes with seizures
Genetic anomalies
Chromosomal abnormalities
Syndromes with microcephaly
Syndromes with hypotonia